The Théâtre municipal de Tunis (engl. Municipal Theatre of Tunis) in Tunisia was first opened on November 20, 1902 and currently showcases opera, ballet, symphonic concerts and dramas featuring numerous Tunisian, Arab and international actors.

References

External links 
 Homepage of the Théâtre municipal de Tunis

Indoor arenas in Tunisia
Theatres completed in 1902
Music venues completed in 1902
Art Nouveau architecture in Tunisia
Buildings and structures in Tunis
Theatres in Tunisia
1902 establishments in Africa
1900s establishments in Tunisia